Terry Williams (born March 11, 1992) is an American professional gridiron football running back who is currently a free agent. He most recently played for the Edmonton Elks of the Canadian Football League (CFL).

College career
Williams played college football for Phoenix College and the Kutztown University of Pennsylvania.

Professional career
Williams signed with the New York Jets in August 2016.

He signed with the Calgary Stampeders in May 2017. On September 29, 2017, Williams made his first career CFL start and ran for 156 yards and three touchdowns; he was named the CFL player of the week.

Williams signed a contract extension with the Edmonton Elks on December 30, 2020. He played in nine games for the Elks in 2021 and was released on December 28, 2021.

References

External links
 Calgary Stampeders bio

1992 births
Living people
American football running backs
Canadian football running backs
American players of Canadian football
People from Morristown, New Jersey
Players of American football from New Jersey
Phoenix Bears football players
Kutztown Golden Bears football players
Calgary Stampeders players
New York Jets players
Canadian football return specialists
Edmonton Elks players